Las Illas (in Catalan: Les Illes) is a former commune in Pyrénées-Orientales (France), now part of Maureillas-las-Illas.

Geography 
Las Illas is located south of Maureillas and north of Maçanet de Cabrenys (Catalonia, Spain).

History 
Las Illas became a commune in 1790.

Las Illas was only linked to the electricity network on 26 July 1955. The commune had repeatedly asked to have electricity since 1923.

On 20 June 1972, Las Illas was linked with Maureillas and Riunoguès to create the new commune of Maureillas-las-Illas.

Politics and administration

Mayors

Demography 
Demography of Las Illas.

Population under the Ancien Régime is calculated either in number of feu fiscal (f, fire tax), or in number of inhabitants.

After 1975, see Maureillas-las-Illas#Population

Sites of interest 
 The romanesque church of Notre-Dame du Remède.
 The war memorial.

See also 
 Communes of the Pyrénées-Orientales department

Notes 

Former communes of Pyrénées-Orientales